John Sams may refer to:
 John B. Sams, United States Air Force general
 John Sams (cricketer), English cricketer